Leo Hussain (born 1978) is a British conductor, who has mainly concentrated on opera. After tenures as music director of the Rouen Philharmonic Orchestra and the Salzburger Landestheater, he has worked freelance directing operas at major houses in Europe, such as Bizet's Carmen at the Royal Danish Theatre, Korngold's Die tote Stadt at the Théâtre du Capitole, and Weinberg's Die Passagierin at the Oper Frankfurt. He has also conducted outside Europe, for example Capriccio by Richard Strauss at the Santa Fe Opera, as well as concerts in Japan, Australia and New Zealand.

Life and career 
Born in 1978, Leo Hussain studied at St John's College, Cambridge, and the Royal Academy of Music. He served as an assistant to Simon Rattle at the Salzburg Festival, working with the Berlin Philharmonic which won him international recognition. He was also inspired by Daniel Barenboim and Yannick Nézet-Séguin.

Hussain was music director of the Salzburger Landestheater from 2009 to the 2013/14 season. He was offered the conductorship of the Rouen Philharmonic Orchestra in 2014. He made his Royal Opera House debut in the 2015/16 season, conducting Enescu’s Oedipe, and returned in 2019 to conduct Mozart's Die Zauberflöte.

Hussain conducted Tchaikovsky's Eugen Onegin at the Bavarian State Opera, Bizet's Carmen at the Royal Danish Theatre and Korngold's Die tote Stadt at the Théâtre du Capitole in Toulouse. In the United States, he has led Puccini's Tosca at the San Francisco Opera and Capriccio by Richard Strauss at the Santa Fe Opera. Productions at the Oper Frankfurt have included the double bill of Ravel's L'heure espagnole and de Falla's La vida breve, as well as Weinberg's Die Passagierin in 2015. A reviewer of Weinberg's opera – concerning a concentration-camp survivor and her former female guard – noted that Hussain excelled in realising numerous aspects of the score, including chamber music moments, hard cutting beats in the percussion, and distorted parodies of entertainment music, in the tradition of Mahler and Shostakovich. Hussain returned in the 2021/22 season for Cimarosa's L'Italiana in Londra.

Hussain conducted Britten's The Rape of Lucretia at the Glyndebourne Festival, and Alban Berg's Wozzeck and Schönberg's Gurrelieder for the George Enescu Festival.

In concerts, Hussain has conducted the West Australian Symphony Orchestra and the Tasmanian Symphony Orchestra in Australia, the Auckland Philharmonia Orchestra in New Zealand, and the NHK Symphony Orchestra and the Tokyo Metropolitan Symphony Orchestra at the Tokyo Spring Festival.

References

External links 
 Leo Hussain / Dirigat operabase.com
 

1978 births
Living people
British male conductors (music)
Alumni of St John's College, Cambridge
21st-century British conductors (music)
21st-century British male musicians